Tomás Hernández Burillo (19 February 1930 – 2 January 1982), commonly known as Moreno, was a Spanish footballer who played as a forward.

Club career
Born in Zaragoza, Aragon, Moreno spent four years of his career with La Liga giants FC Barcelona, after signing from local UD Huesca in early 1952. In his first two seasons the Catalonia club won the league, the Copa del Rey and the Copa Eva Duarte, with the player being instrumental in the 1952–53 league conquest – 22 goals in just 30 matches, only trailing Telmo Zarra in the Pichichi Trophy race. He was part of the Blaugrana's attacking line which also featured César, László Kubala, Eduardo Manchón and Mariano Martín.

Moreno retired professionally in 1958 at only 28, after unassuming top division spells with UD Las Palmas and Real Zaragoza, dying in his hometown at the age of 51.

International career
Courtesy of his spectacular club season with Barcelona, Moreno earned two caps with Spain, both in July 1953. His debut came on the 5th, in a 0–1 friendly loss to Argentina.

Honours
Barcelona
La Liga: 1951–52, 1952–53
Copa del Generalísimo: 1952, 1952–53
Copa Eva Duarte: 1952, 1953
Latin Cup: 1952

References

External links

1930 births
1982 deaths
Footballers from Zaragoza
Spanish footballers
Association football forwards
La Liga players
Segunda División players
SD Huesca footballers
FC Barcelona players
CD Condal players
UE Lleida players
UD Las Palmas players
Real Zaragoza players
Spain B international footballers
Spain international footballers